Nobunaga (written: 信長) is both a Japanese masculine name & surname. Notable people with the surname include:

Given Name
, Japanese noble
, Japanese daimyō
, Japanese former basketball coach
, Japanese voice actor

Surname
, Japanese composer of choral music

Fictional Characters
, a character from Inuyasha
, a character from ReLIFE
, a character from Nogizaka Haruka no Himitsu
, a character from Hunter X Hunter
, a character from Slam Dunk
, a character based on the real Nobunaga Oda from Drifters

Japanese-language surnames
Japanese masculine given names